"Take a Walk" is a song by American indietronica band Passion Pit from their second studio album, Gossamer (2012). The song was written and produced by the band's frontman Michael Angelakos, with Chris Zane providing co-production. It was released as the lead single from the album in May 2012.

Rolling Stone named "Take a Walk" the third-best song of 2012.

Background
"Take a Walk" was written by Michael Angelakos, lead singer and keyboardist of Passion Pit. The song's lyrical content depicts a businessman burdened by financial troubles. According to Angelakos, each verse of the song is based upon a certain member of his family at one point in their life.

In popular culture
The song appeared in a commercial by fast food chain Taco Bell advertising their Doritos Locos. Reception by the band's fan base to the song's use in the commercial was mixed. Angelakos defended the use of "Take a Walk" in the commercial, explaining: "It's not about promoting celebrities or giant corporations or anything like that. It’s just airtime…It's an amazing opportunity. And, honestly, you take what you can get. I say no to about 90 percent of the offers, but we just want people to hear the music at the end of the day."
The song appears on the soundtrack of the 2012 racing video game Forza Horizon, on the in-game radio station Horizon Pulse.
The song also appears on the soundtrack of baseball video game MLB 2K13 from publisher 2K Games. This was the last game in the series.

Music video
The music video for "Take a Walk" was directed by David Wilson in collaboration with the Creators Project. The video is seen from the perspective of a ball as it bounces across several locations in and around Philadelphia, including a suburban neighborhood (Plymouth Meeting), farmland (Maple acres farm), Fairmount Park, and various parts of the city. Advanced helicam technology was utilized in the production of the video in order to achieve the effect.

Formats and track listings
Digital download
 "Take a Walk" – 4:23

Digital download – remix single
 "Take a Walk" (The M Machine Remix) – 4:23

Charts

Weekly charts

Year-end charts

Certifications

References

2012 singles
Passion Pit songs
Music videos directed by David Wilson (director)
Songs written by Michael Angelakos
2011 songs
Columbia Records singles
Songs about New York City